Located on the Vainudden peninsular - part of Hitå - in Southern Sipoo is a small standing stone and evidence of Nordic Bronze Age activity c. 1700–500 BC

Standing Stone

The stones are of rectangular cross-section approximately 50 cm x 50 cm arranged in a square with single upright stone of same cross-section standing 1m high. The stone is now a marker of the border between properties in the area.

Bronze-Age Activities

To the immediate south of the stone is an area thought to have been used for carving stones and possibly camping; two rocks show possible workings by hand. There is circumstantial evidence of a moat. The rocks are covered in moss and lichen making identification of the area difficult.

References 

Monuments
Bronze Age